Siyamthanda Kolisi (born 16 June 1991) is a South African professional rugby union player who currently captains the South Africa national team and also the Cell C Sharks. He generally plays as a flanker and a loose forward. In 2018, Kolisi was appointed captain of the Springboks, becoming the first black man to hold the position and eventually leading the South African Rugby team to victory in the 2019 Rugby World Cup Final against England. In December 2019, Kolisi was named in New African magazine's list of 100 Most Influential Africans.

Early life

Kolisi grew up in Zwide, Ibhayi, a township outside of Port Elizabeth. Kolisi's mother, Phakama, was 16 when Siya was born and his father, Fezakele, was in his final year of school. Kolisi's mother died when he was 15, leaving his late grandmother, Nolulamile, to raise him. At the age of 12, he impressed scouts at a youth tournament in Mossel Bay and was offered a scholarship at Grey Junior in Port Elizabeth. He was subsequently offered a rugby scholarship to the prestigious Grey High School, which South African cricketer Graeme Pollock and England International Mike Catt had attended. Kolisi was a regular member of the first XV rugby team. He was also a part of the  youth set-up between 2007 and 2009, playing in the Under-16 Grant Khomo week and the Under-18 Craven Week before shifting west to join Western Province. He further represented the South Africa national under-18 rugby union team (SA Schools team) for two consecutive years.

Career

Kolisi made his senior debut for Western Province against the  during the 2011 Vodacom Cup and later in the year several injuries and international call-ups gave him the opportunity to make regular starts in the Currie Cup.

2012 saw Kolisi graduate to the Stormers squad and he made an immediate impact with 16 appearances during the season, scoring one try. The second half of the year was not so kind to him as a thumb injury restricted him to just one appearance in the 2012 Currie Cup and he had to watch on from the sidelines as Province lifted the trophy for their 33rd Currie Cup title.

Kolisi returned with a bang the following year and held his place in the Stormers side despite fierce competition among the loose forwards. 13 appearances and 2 tries were recorded and this earned him his first international recognition.

Kolisi was selected as the new captain of the Stormers on 20 February 2017. He was selected as the new captain of the Springboks on 28 May 2018, becoming the team's first black captain in its 126-year history. Bryan Habana, former Springbok and of mixed race, praised Kolisi's appointment: "It's a monumental moment for South African rugby, and a moment in South African history."

Kolisi was on the board of directors of MyPlayers Rugby, which is the players' organisation of all the professional rugby players in South Africa.

Kolisi signed for the Sharks in February 2021 following the successful majority share purchase of the Sharks by MVM Holidings.

International career

Kolisi was a member of the South Africa under 20 side that competed in both the 2010 and 2011 IRB Junior World Championships.

Kolisi made his national team debut as Springbok 851 on 15 June 2013 against  at the Mbombela Stadium in Nelspruit. He replaced the injured Arno Botha in the 5th minute and was named as Man of the Match as South Africa won 30–17. Nine further substitute appearances followed during the 2013 international season as he firmly established himself as a regular member of the national squad. Kolisi also played two matches for South Africa in the 2015 Rugby World Cup against Japan and Samoa.

Kolisi became the first ever black player to lead the Springboks in a Test match in the match against England at Ellis Park on 9 June 2018. He captained the South African team at the 2019 Rugby World Cup in Yokohama, Japan, defeating England 32–12 in the final to lift the Webb Ellis Cup. This was South Africa's third World Cup win, tying with New Zealand. Siya Kolisi become the first black captain of a World Cup-winning side.

Personal life 
Kolisi married Rachel Kolisi in 2016 and  they have two children together: son Nicholas Siyamthanda (born 2015) and daughter Keziah (born 2017). Since 2014 Siya's half-siblings, Liyema and Liphelo, children of Siya's mother who died in 2009, have been part of the Kolisi household, after five years in orphanages and foster care in Port Elizabeth. Rachel, one year older than Siya, is from Grahamstown and worked in event management before taking on duties as a full-time mother.

Kolisi is a devout Christian.

Kolisi is an ardent fan of English club Liverpool F.C.

Kolisi's alma mater Grey High School proudly renamed its first XV rugby field as The Kolisi Field in 2022, in celebration of its most famous past pupil.

Philanthropy 
In response to the COVID-19 pandemic in South Africa, Kolisi and his wife launched The Kolisi Foundation in 2020. The foundation aims to change the narratives of inequality in South Africa. The focus areas of the Kolisi Foundation address the systemic issues in Gender-Based Violence, Food Insecurity and Education and Sport, with special attention paid to Zwide township where Kolisi grew up, and other under-resourced areas of South Africa. Kolisi with his friend and cricketer Faf du Plessis donated food to the community street feeding scheme in Bonteheuwel during the pandemic.

Statistics

Test match record

P = Games played, W = Games won, D = Games drawn, L = Games lost, Tri = Tries scored, Pts = Points scored

Test tries (6)

Super Rugby statistics

Bibliography
 Jeremy Daniel, Siya Kolisi: Against All Odds, Jonathan Ball Publishers, 2018, 
 Siya Kolisi, Rise, autobiography, HarperCollins, 2021,

References

External links
 
 
 

1991 births
Living people
Rugby union players from Port Elizabeth
Xhosa people
South African rugby union players
Stormers players
Western Province (rugby union) players
Rugby union flankers
South Africa international rugby union players
South Africa Under-20 international rugby union players
Alumni of Grey High School
South Africa national rugby union team captains
South African Christians
Sharks (rugby union) players
Sharks (Currie Cup) players